Live in Moscow may refer to:

 Live in Moscow (Coil video), 2001
 Live in Moscow (Red Elvises DVD), 2006
 Live in Moscow (album), a 2007 live album by Stone Sour